Ima Lee Wells (née Greenwood; September 23, 1936 – August 10, 2014) was an American educator and politician.

Born in Buffalo, Oklahoma, Wells received her bachelor's degree in education from Northwestern Oklahoma State University and her master's degree in education from New Mexico State University. She taught school in Kansas and New Mexico. In 1993, Wells served in the New Mexico House of Representatives as a Democrat. She died in Loveland, Colorado.

Notes

1936 births
2014 deaths
People from Harper County, Oklahoma
Northwestern Oklahoma State University alumni
New Mexico State University alumni
Women state legislators in New Mexico
Democratic Party members of the New Mexico House of Representatives
Schoolteachers from New Mexico
American women educators
21st-century American women
Politicians from Oklahoma